Daydream is the second extended play by South Korean rock band Day6. It was released by JYP Entertainment on March 30, 2016. The extended play features six original tracks.

Track listing

Charts

Sales

Release history

References 

JYP Entertainment EPs
Korean-language EPs
2016 EPs
Genie Music EPs
Day6 EPs